Diocese of Pune may refer to:

Roman Catholic Diocese of Poona
Diocese of Pune (Church of North India)